Islam in Colombia is a minority religion, with most Colombians adhering to Christianity (Roman Catholicism). According to a 2018 study conducted Pew Research Center, the size of the Colombian Muslim population ranges from about 85,000–100,000 people out of a total population of 50.4 million. In 2011, it was estimated that Colombian Muslim community numbered just 10,000 people or (0.02% of the total Colombian population). The Muslim population of Colombia has reportedly been growing, mostly due to conversion. Most Colombian Muslims are converts or Muslim immigrants from the Arab World. The majority of converts to Islam in Colombia (70%) are women. 

There are a number of Islamic communities in Colombia, the most important of which, according to their size, are in Bogotá, Maicao and Buenaventura. There are also Islamic centers in San Andrés, Nariño Department, Santa Marta and Cartagena. There are also primary and secondary Islamic schools in Bogotá and Maicao. Maicao plays host to the continent's third largest mosque, the Mosque of Omar Ibn Al-Khattab. Most Muslims in Colombia are descendants of Arab immigrants from Syria, Lebanon, and Palestine during the late 19th to early 20th century. The Afro-Colombian Muslims in Buenaventura, Colombia's main Pacific port city, have over the years embraced the teachings of the Nation of Islam, mainstream Sunni Islam, and the Shia Islam denomination.

The Ahmadiyya Community also has a presence in the country.

Mosques
 Abou Bakr Al-Siddiq Mosque
 Mosque of Omar Ibn Al-Khattab

See also

Arab diaspora in Colombia
Lebanese Colombian
Palestinian Colombian
Religion in Colombia

References

 
Society of Colombia
Col